The Iceland national baseball team represents Iceland in international competitions. 

The team is controlled by the Icelandic Baseball Association, which is a provisional member of the Confederation of European Baseball since .

National baseball teams in Europe
Baseball